Qalacıq or Kaladzhik or Kaladzhyk or Kaladzhyh or Kaladzhykh may refer to:

Qalacıq, Ismailli, Azerbaijan
Qalacıq, Jabrayil, Azerbaijan
Qalacıq, Qusar, Azerbaijan